Gocycle is an electric bicycle manufactured by Karbon Kinetics Limited, a company founded in 2002 by Richard Thorpe, who is an industrial designer that once worked at the racing car company McLaren. The Gocycle has interchangeable quick release wheels, a fully enclosed chain, gearing and cabling, a molded magnesium frame and wheels and a flat pack storage and transport system, in which the bicycle folds up and can be carried in a case. The electric motor is powered by a rechargeable lithium-ion battery.
 
In 2009, after an extensive development process, the business launched the Gocycle G1 to international acclaim. The G1 capitalized on Richard’s expertise from a 25-year career working in the motorsports and light electric vehicle industry, becoming the most recent injection-molded magnesium alloy bicycle after the Kirk Precision in 1992. It set the foundations which have enabled Gocycle to push boundaries with each of its three new models continually.

The Gocycle G2 entered the market in 2012, becoming the first production electric bike to have Bluetooth connectivity. It was followed by the Gocycle G3 in 2016, which debuted an automotive-inspired Daytime Running Light (DRL)– another industry first– and the all-rounder Gocycle GS in 2017. At the start of 2019, the business debuted its new fast-folding Gocycle GX model, which is capable of being folded and stowed. The fast-folding Gocycle GXi followed later in 2019.

In 2021, the company introduced Generation Four (G4) Gocycle models: G4, G4i & G4i+.

Products

Gocycle G1 
The multi-award-winning Gocycle G1 launched in Europe to international media acclaim and later that year the Gocycle G1 won the Best Electric Bike award at Eurobike 2009.

Gocycle G2 
The Gocycle G2 launched at Eurobike 2012 being the first production electric bike to be digitally connected via Bluetooth and again wins the Best Electric Bike Eurobike award.

Gocycle G3 
The Gocycle G3 launched in Europe in March 2016 with its automotive-inspired Daytime Running Light (DRL), another first in the industry.

Gocycle GS 
The all-rounder Gocycle GS  model was successfully funded on Kickstarter November 2016  and was officially launched October 2017

Gocycle GX 
The fast-folding Gocycle GX, which debuted at the start of 2019, is capable of being folded and stowed in under 10 seconds.

Gocycle GXi 
The GXi sets a new standard for rider-focused technology in the folding e-bike segment.

Gocycle G4, G4i & G4i+ 
The new G4 and G4i models set a new standard for lightweight design, innovation and performance in the portable urban e-bike segment.

See also

 List of electric bicycle brands and manufacturers
 Outline of cycling

References

Additional sources

External links
"Gocycle GS e-bike: ‘I’ve yet to ride one I thought was better". The Guardian. 2019-01-20. Retrieved 2019-02-15
 "Gocycle GS folding e-bike". Cycling Weekly. 2019-02-06. Retrieved 2019-02-15.
that goes 20 mph, travels for 40 miles – and folds down flat in 7 SECONDS"]. The Sun. 2019-02-06. Retrieved 2019-02-15.
 "Gocycle GX is a folding bike to rival the Brompton Electric". Pocket-lint. 2019-02-06. Retrieved 2019-02-15.
 "Magnesium in frame to be cycling's metal of the future" The Independent Newspaper Retrieved 2021-04-05

Electric bicycles
Electric vehicle manufacturers of the United Kingdom
Cycle types
Bicycle
History of cycling
Micromobility
Electric
Road cycles